6,6-Difluoronorethisterone, also known as 6,6-difluoro-17α-ethynyl-19-nortestosterone or as 6,6-difluoro-17α-ethynylestr-4-en-17β-ol-3-one, is a steroidal progestin of the 19-nortestosterone group that was described in 1971 but was never marketed. It is a fluorinated derivative of norethisterone.  The C17β acetate ester, 6,6-difluoronorethisterone acetate, has also been synthesized and described.

References

Estranes
Enones
Organofluorides
Progestogens
Alkynols